
Gmina Modliborzyce is a rural gmina (administrative district) in Janów Lubelski County, Lublin Voivodeship, in eastern Poland.

Villages
Gmina Modliborzyce contains the villages and settlements of Antolin, Bilsko, Brzeziny, Ciechocin, Dąbie, Felinów, Gwizdów, Kalenne, Kolonia Zamek, Lute, Majdan, Michałówka, Modliborzyce, Pasieka, Słupie, Stojeszyn Drugi, Stojeszyn Pierwszy, Stojeszyn-Kolonia, Świnki, Węgliska, Wierzchowiska Drugie, Wierzchowiska Pierwsze, Wolica Druga, Wolica Pierwsza and Zarajec.

Neighbouring gminas
Gmina Modliborzyce is bordered by the gminas of Batorz, Godziszów, Janów Lubelski, Potok Wielki, Pysznica and Szastarka.

References

Polish official population figures 2006

Modliborzyce
Janów Lubelski County